Austin Denham (September 29, 1850 – June 3, 1948) was a United States Navy sailor and a recipient of the United States military's highest decoration, the Medal of Honor.

Biography
Born on September 29, 1850, in England, Denham immigrated to the United States at age 12. He lived in New York City and enlisted in the Navy as soon as he was old enough. On that day, he helped rescue several men who were in danger of drowning after their boat capsized in heavy surf. For this action, he was awarded the Medal of Honor three months later, on July 9, 1872.

Denham's official Medal of Honor citation reads:
On board the U.S.S. Kansas near Greytown, Nicaragua, 12 April 1872. Displaying great coolness and self-possession at the time Comdr. A. F. Crosman and others were drowned, Denham, by heroism and personal exertion, prevented greater loss of life.

Denham retired from the Navy in 1912 as a seaman first class, after a 48-year career. He died in Burbank, California, on June 3, 1948, of a heart attack. Aged 97 at his death, he was the oldest living Medal of Honor recipient at the time. Denham was buried at Calvary Cemetery in Los Angeles, California.

See also

List of Medal of Honor recipients during peacetime

References

Further reading

1850 births
1948 deaths
English emigrants to the United States
United States Navy sailors
United States Navy Medal of Honor recipients
English-born Medal of Honor recipients
Non-combat recipients of the Medal of Honor